Masabumi Kikuchi with Gil Evans is a studio album led by jazz pianist and composer Masabumi Kikuchi with support of Gil Evans, recorded during Gil's first visitation to Japan in 1972. CD version was released from EmArcy label in 1989 with additional three tracks.

Background
Masabumi Kikuchi first visited and met with Gil Evans in spring of 1972 when Masabumi had been traveling to New York City to join in Elvin Jones' group. Masabumi and Gil hit it off to organize hybrid orchestra from Japan and US. Toshinari Koinuma had managed to coordinate the personnels, hired twenty one Japanese players except for Masabumi, and Gil visited Japan for the first time with Billy Harper and Marvin Peterson. The three men arrived at Haneda Airport on June 22.

The concert was named "Kikuchi Masabumi Recital", and held at four cities; started from Tokyo on 27th, Osaka, Wakayama and Nagoya. Although the original plan was to do live recording at Tokyo concert, Masabumi and Gil insisted studio recording after all the concerts. The three men had attended and experienced another studio recording of Kimiko Kasai's album Satin Doll at CBS/Sony 1st Studio in Tokyo on 26th. All the orchestra members came together at Victor Studio in Tokyo again on July 4, and the recording took all night long.

Track listing

Personnel

Masabumi Kikuchi – electric piano
Gil Evans – conductor, piano
Billy Harper – tenor sax, flute, chime
Marvin Peterson – trumpet, flugel horn
Kohsuke Mine – alto sax, soprano sax
Shigeo Suzuki – alto sax, flute
Kiyoshige Matsubara – French horn
Nao Yamamoto – French horn
Shozo Nakagawa – piccolo flute, alto flute, bass flute
Takashi Asahi – piccolo flute, alto flute, bass flute
Yukio Etoh – piccolo flute, alto flute, bass flute
Kunitoshi Shinohara – trumpet, flugel horn
Takehisa Suzuki – trumpet, flugel horn
Hiroshi Munekiyo – tuba
Kikuzo Tado – tuba
Tadataka Nakazawa – bass tuba
Michiko Takahashi – marimba, vibraphone
Masayuki Takayanagi – electric guitar
Sadanori Nakamure – electric guitar
Yoshio Suzuki – bass
Isao Etoh – electric bass
Masahiko Togashi – drums
Yoshiyuki Nakamura – drums
Kohichi Yamaguchi – timpani
Hideo Miyata – percussion

References

1970 albums
Masabumi Kikuchi albums